Chaika or Chayka is the word for seagull in several Slavic languages.

It may refer to:

People 
 Chaika (surname), a Slavic surname (including a list of people with the name)
 Chaika or Chayka, the call sign for astronaut Valentina Tereshkova

Places 
 Kyiv Chaika Airfield, an airfield in Ukraine
 Chayka, Golden Sands, an area within the Golden Sands area, near the city of Varna, Bulgaria
 Chayka, Varna, a neighborhood in the city of Varna
 Chayka, Varna Province, a village in Provadiya Municipality, Varna Province, Bulgaria.
 Chayka, Atyrau, a village in western Kazakhstan

Technology 
 CHAYKA, a radio navigation system
 Chaika (car), an automobile made in the former Soviet Union
 Chaika (boat), a type of boat used by the Zaporozhian Cossacks
 Chaika (camera), a 35 mm camera made in the former Soviet Union
 Chaika watches, a women's brand of watch made in the former Soviet Union
 Chaika L-4, a Russian amphibious aircraft
 Polikarpov I-153 Chaika, a biplane fighter made by the former Soviet Union
 Polikarpov I-15, predecessor of I-153
 Beriev Be-12, Soviet amphibious military aircraft

Other uses 
 1671 Chaika, an asteroid
 The Seagull, a play by Anton Chekhov
 Chaika - The Coffin Princess, a Japanese light novel and anime series
 "Chaika", a 2016 song by Pussy Riot
 SC Chaika Petropavlivska Borshchahivka, a Ukrainian football club

See also 
 Czajka (disambiguation)